is a railway station in the city of Tagajō, Miyagi Prefecture, Japan, operated by East Japan Railway Company (JR East).

Lines
Geba Station is served by the Senseki Line. It is located 14.4 rail kilometers from the terminus of the Senseki Line at Aoba-dōri Station.

Station layout
The station has two opposed side platforms connected by a footbridge. The station is staffed.

Platforms

History
Geba Station opened on August 1, 1932 as a station on the Miyagi Electric Railway. The line was nationalized on May 1, 1944. The station was absorbed into the JR East network upon the privatization of JNR on April 1, 1987. A new station building was completed in November 2013.

Passenger statistics
In fiscal 2018, the station was used by an average of 3,762 passengers daily (boarding passengers only).

Surrounding area
Geba Post Office

See also
 List of Railway Stations in Japan

References

External links

  

Railway stations in Miyagi Prefecture
Senseki Line
Railway stations in Japan opened in 1932
Stations of East Japan Railway Company
Tagajō, Miyagi